Proculus is the second attested bishop of Marseilles in southern Gaul, apparently in office from 380 to 430 AD. Ambitious and petulant, he refused the leadership of the  bishop of Aix, capital of the province of Viennensis Secunda to which Marseilles was suffragan. Opposed also to Patroclus, bishop of Arles, then primate of the Gaulish hierarchy, Proculus established two village bishoprics at the limit of his territory and subject to his authority. Pope Zosimus tried to restrain him, but with Zosimus' death (417AD) the
issue petered out.

References

 Elie Griffe, La Gaule chrétienne à l'époque romaine, Paris, Letouzey et Ané, 1947
 Ralph W. Mathison, Ecclesiastical Factionalism and Religious Controversy in Fifth-Century Gaul, Catholic University of America Press, 1989

4th-century bishops in Gaul
5th-century bishops in Gaul
Bishops of Marseille